Carol Anne Hilton is a Vancouver-based Hesquiaht author and CEO. She wrote Indigenomics: Taking a Seat at the Economic Table and is the founder and CEO of The Indigenomics Institute.

Early life and education 
Hilton is Nuu-chah-nulth of the Hesquiaht nation on Vancouver Island.

She obtained her master's in business administration from the UK's Hertfordshire University in 2004.

Career 

Hilton is the author of Indigenomics: Taking a Seat at the Economic Table  which was shortlisted for a Donner Prize in 2022. The title of the book comes from the #Indigenomics hashtag that she coined on Twitter in 2012. The book addresses the common rhetoric and perception from non-Indigenous people that Indigenous people are recipients of government financial support, and critiques the "economic displacement" of Indigenous people. Kevin Carmichael writing in the Financial Post calls it a "manifesto" and "revelatory", noting how it "forces non-Indigenous readers to confront shame and embarrassment over the systematic exclusion of founding peoples from the country’s economic life." Carmichael comparers her writing that of Zambian economist Dambisa Moyo. It was published by New Society Publishers.

Hilton is the founder and the CEO of The Indigenomics Institute and Transformation International (Indigenous social and economic development company). She served on the Canadian Federal Economic Growth Council.

As of 2018 she was the Director of the McGill University's Institute of the Study of Canada and also the National Canadian Community Economic Development Network.  She was also faculty at Simon Fraser University’s Community Economic Development Program and the faculty lead at the Banff Center’s Indigenous Business Program.

Personal life 
Hilton lives in Victoria, British Columbia.

See also 

 Indigenous peoples in Canada

References

External links 

 2018 Canada's National Observer OpEd Indigenomics: on recognition and the uncomfortable space

Year of birth missing (living people)
Living people
People from Vancouver Island
21st-century Canadian women writers
21st-century Canadian writers
Canadian economics writers
Alumni of the University of Hertfordshire
Women founders
First Nations women writers